Sheikh Ali Hajjaj As-Suwaisy (1926-2001) (الشيخ على حسن السويسى) was a famous Quran reciter, known in Egypt and across the world. He gained fame by emulating the late Sheikh Muhammad Rifat.

Sheikh joined the radio in 1946-47 and entered the music institute to study oud and music theory for four years when he saw the encouragement and success of his reciting. Ali is admired for his use of maqam saba - his voice was considered especially suited to saba.

Ali visited the UK on several occasions, in particular attending the London Central Mosque during Ramadan.

See also
Qur'an reading
Sheikh Muhammad Rifat
Sheikh Mohamed Siddiq El-Minshawi

External links
 Islamic Awareness

Egyptian Quran reciters
Egyptian Muslims
1926 births
2001 deaths